A Christmas Star is a 2015 British Christmas film featuring Pierce Brosnan and Liam Neeson.

Plot
Born in dramatic circumstances under the Christmas Star, Noelle believes she has the gift to perform strange miracles.

A businessman, originally from the Irish town of Pottersglen, returns to try to exploit the townspeople. Noelle uses the power of positivity to save the snow globe factory and the town.

Cast
 Robert James-Collier as Pat McKerrod
 Suranne Jones as Miss Darcy
 Bronagh Waugh as Maria O'Hanlon
 Erin Galway-Kendrick as Noelle O'Hanlon
 Pierce Brosnan as Mr. Shepherd
 Liam Neeson as narrator/Radio DJ
 Julian Fellowes as himself
 Kylie Minogue as herself

Reception
On review aggregator Rotten Tomatoes, the film holds an approval rating of 38% based on 8 reviews, with an average rating of 4.25/10.  Grace Montgomery of Common Sense Media awarded A Christmas Star two stars out of five.  Trevor Johnston of Time Out gave A Christmas Star one star out of five.  Leslie Felperin of The Guardian awarded the film three stars out of five.  James Luxford of Radio Times gave the film three stars out of five.  Tara Brady of The Irish Times awarded it three stars out of five.

See also
 List of Christmas films

References

External links
 
 

2015 films
British Christmas drama films
Films set in Belfast
Films set in Chicago
Films set in Northern Ireland
2010s Christmas drama films
2010s English-language films
2010s British films